Abderrahim Chafay (born July 21, 1977) is a Moroccan-French Muay Thai kickboxer.

Biography 
In 2011, Chafay challenged the reigning WAKO World Low Kick champion Salko Žildžić for the title. He defeated Salko through a second round KO.

Chafay fought Cyril Benzaquen for the FFSCDA -81kg title during the inaugural Night Fighter event. Benzaquen won the fight by a third round TKO.

His last fight, before taking a six year break from the sport, was a rematch with Salko Žildžić. Žildžić won their rematch in the third round, by TKO.

Returning from his break, Chafay was scheduled to fight Andrey Chekhonin for the WAKO World Low Kick 85.1kg title. Chekhonin won the fight by a first round KO.

Titles and accomplishments 
 2011 FFSCDA Muay Thai -81kg Champion
 2011 WAKO World Low Kick -85.1kg Champion
 2012 FFSCDA Kickboxing -81kg Champion

Fight record

|-  bgcolor="#fbb"
| 2020-02-22 || Loss ||align=left| Andrey Chekhonin || Senshi 5 || Varna, Bulgaria || TKO || 1 || 
|-
! style=background:white colspan=9 |
|-  bgcolor="#fbb"
| 2014-05-23 || Loss ||align=left| Salko Zildžić || Noć Šampiona VII || Tuzla, Bosnia and Herzegovina || TKO || 3 ||
|-  bgcolor="#fbb"
| 2014-04-26 || Loss ||align=left| Cyril Benzaquen || Night Fighter 1 || Toulouse, France || TKO || 3 || 
|-
! style=background:white colspan=9 |
|-  bgcolor="#fbb"
| 2014-01-25 || Loss ||align=left| Vladimír Moravčík || Clash Muay Thai || Bratislava, Slovakia || KO || 1 ||
|-  bgcolor="#cfc"
| 2013-03-16 || Win ||align=left| Didier Charlesege || Kick Imperator V - K1 Rules Explosion || L'Île-Rousse, France || Decision (Unanimous) || 5 || 3:00
|-  bgcolor="#fbb"
| 2013-03-03 || Loss ||align=left| Alka Matewa || Ikuza 2 || Brussels || TKO || 4 ||
|-  bgcolor="#cfc"
| 2012-12-15 || Win ||align=left| Marina Rosu || Croatia Open 2012 - Christamas Cup || Osijek, Croatia || Decision (Unanimous) || 5 || 3:00
|-  bgcolor="#fbb"
| 2012-06-22 || Loss ||align=left| Yassine Ahaggan || Carcharias || Perpignan, France || KO || 1 ||
|-  bgcolor="#fbb"
| 2012-06-01 || Loss ||align=left| Yassine Ahaggan || Impacts Fight Night: championnats d'Europe WBC || Bordeaux, France || TKO || 2 ||
|-  bgcolor="#cfc"
| 2012-05-12 || Win ||align=left| Alassane Sy || Championnat De France Elite K1 || Bompas, France || Decision (Unanimous) || 5 || 3:00
|-
! style=background:white colspan=9 |
|-  bgcolor="#fbb"
| 2012-02-11 || Loss ||align=left| Alexander Gordei || WAKO World Grand Prix K1 Rules France/Russie || Marseille, France || KO || 1 ||
|-  bgcolor="#cfc"
| 2011-12-28 || Win ||align=left| Salko Zildžić || Night Of Champions VI || Tuzla, Bosnia and Herzegovina || KO || 2 || 
|-
! style=background:white colspan=9 |
|-  bgcolor="#cfc"
| 2011-05-07 || Win ||align=left| Malik Aliane || Finales Championnat De France Muaythai || Paris, France || TKO || 4 || 
|-
! style=background:white colspan=9 |
|-  bgcolor="#cfc"
| 2011-03-26 || Win ||align=left|  || 1/2 Finales Championnat de France De Muaythai FFSCDA || Paris, France || KO ||  ||
|-  bgcolor="#cfc"
| 2010-11-06|| Win ||align=left| Fatah Abderrezak || Shock Muay 3 || Saint-Denis, Réunion || KO || 4 ||
|-  bgcolor="#fbb"
| 2010-04-03|| Loss ||align=left| Johane Beausejour || Finales du Championnat de France de Muaythai || Paris, France || TKO || 3 || 
|-
! style=background:white colspan=9 |
|-  bgcolor="#cfc"
| 2009-05-23 || Win ||align=left| Kader Doumbia || Shock Muay 2 || Saint-Denis, Réunion || TKO || 1 ||
|-  bgcolor="#cfc"
| 2009-05-23 || Win ||align=left| Kader Doumbia || Shock Muay  || Saint-Denis, Réunion || TKO || 1 || 
|-
|-
| colspan=9 | Legend:

See also
List of male kickboxers

References 

1977 births
Living people
French male kickboxers
Moroccan male kickboxers
Middleweight kickboxers
Sportspeople from Marrakesh